The 2011 South American Rugby Championship "A" was the 33rd edition of the two tiered competition of the leading national rugby union teams in South America.

The tournament was arranged in Argentina, in the city of Puerto Iguazú, except for a match in Posadas. Like in the previous years, four teams played to qualify to the final pool, with Argentina (host) admitted directly. The first two were qualified, keeping the results of their matches also for second round. Chile won the pool and Uruguay was the runner-up. Argentina Jaguars won the final, after easy wins over Chile and Uruguay.

Phase 1

{| class="wikitable"
|-
!width=165|Team
!width=40|Played
!width=40|Won
!width=40|Drawn
!width=40|Lost
!width=40|For
!width=40|Against
!width=40|Difference
!width=40|BP
!width=40|Pts
|- bgcolor=#ccffcc align=center
|align=left| 
|3||3||0||0||117||27||+90||0||9
|- bgcolor=#ccffcc align=center
|align=left| 
|3||2||0||1||159||45||+114||0||6
|- align=center
|align=left| 
|3||1||0||2||75||78||−3||0||3
|- bgcolor=#ffdddd align=center
|align=left| 
|3||0||0||3||23||224||−201||0||0
|}

 First round

Second round

Third round

Phase 2

{| class="wikitable"
|-
!width=165|Team
!width=40|Played
!width=40|Won
!width=40|Drawn
!width=40|Lost
!width=40|For
!width=40|Against
!width=40|Difference
!width=40|BP
!width=40|Pts
|- bgcolor=#ccffcc align=center
|align=left| 
|2||2||0||0||136||20||+116||0||6
|- align=center
|align=left| 
|2||1||0||1||27||79||−22||0||3
|- align=center
|align=left| 
|2||0||0||2||32||96||−56||0||0
|}
Argentina won the competition

See also 
 2011 South American Rugby Championship "B"

References

 IRB – South American Championship 2011
Details

Notes

2011
2011 rugby union tournaments for national teams
A
2011 in Argentine rugby union
rugby union
rugby union
rugby union
rugby union
Rugby Championship "A"
International rugby union competitions hosted by Argentina